The Riojan Party is a Spanish political party operating in the autonomous community of La Rioja. The party was formed as the Progressive Riojan Party on 6 December 1982 with the stated aim of occupying the progressive centre in La Rioja.

History
Initially the party was led by Luis Javier Rodriguez Moroy, a former MP in the Spanish Congress of Deputies. Like Rodriguez, many members of the new party came from the Union of the Democratic Centre (UCD), the former governing coalition of Spain which disbanded in February 1983. Rubén García Marañón succeeded Rodriguez as Party President in February 1984 and the party adopted its current name in 1991.

In elections to the Parliament of La Rioja, held every four years from 1983 onwards, the party has usually polled between 6% and 7% and won two deputies out of the thirty three seats available at each election until 2015 when it lost its seats. In elections to the Spanish Congress, the party's highest share was 4.4% in the 1993 election.

In the 2007 local elections, the party polled 6.6% and won 43 council seats, down from the 65 seats and 7.5% that it had polled in 2003.

As of June 2016, the party is led by Fernando Gómez Herrainz.

Election results

Local councils

Regional elections

References

External links
 Official webpage

Political parties in La Rioja (Spain)
Union of the Democratic Centre (Spain)